Momtaz Begum (born 5 May 1974) is a Bangladeshi folk singer and the incumbent Jatiya Sangsad member representing the Manikganj-2 constituency since 2014 and Reserved Women's Seat-21 during 2009–2013. Referred to as "The Music Queen," she has recorded around 700 albums. Some of her notable albums include Return Ticket, Ashol Boithoki, Murshider Talim, and Ronger Bazar.

Begum won Bangladesh National Film Award for Best Female Playback Singer three times for the films Nekabborer Mohaproyan (2014), Swatta (2017) and Maya: The Lost Mother (2019). In 2021, she earned an honorary doctorate degree from Global Human Peace University in Tamil Nadu, India.

Early life
Begum was born on 5 May 1974 in the village Joymontop in Singair, in Manikganj to Uzala Begum and Modhu Boyati, a baul singer. She spent most of her childhood learning music from her father. She also took lessons from Razzak Dewan and Abdur Rashid Sorkar.

Begum's initiation into music occurred early. She was a child when she accompanied her father, first as an audience member, and soon after a co-performer. The kind of music she performed like, Marfati, Boithoki, and Murshidi can roughly be categorized in the mystic songs genre.

Career
Initially Begum's released albums entirely financed by herself. After these became popular she was hired by producers to make further recordings, though her payment was usually a very low flat fee and the contract stipulated that this would have to be paid back if these did not sell well. However, her   musical works are tended to sell out almost immediately and within a very short period, she found herself quite busy; often recording two songs per day. In an interview with the Bangladeshi daily Daily Star she stated: "I used to be handed down the lyrics and the music tracks minutes before and there used to be hardly any time for rehearsal and I had to record it at all in one go".

Begum was elected as a member of  parliament from Manikganj-2 in 2014.

Charity work
Begum established a 50-bed Momtaz Eye Hospital with support from Orbis International, in her native village Joymontop. The hospital was established in memory of her father, Modhu Boyati, who lost his eyesight as he could not afford a cataract operation due to poverty.

Personal life
Begum resides in Mohakhali DOHS, Dhaka.

References

External links
Singer Momtaz Speaks to VOA (26-May-2006) VOA, Washington.

Living people
1974 births
Bangladeshi women musicians
Bangladeshi folk singers
20th-century Bangladeshi women singers
20th-century Bangladeshi singers
Best Female Playback Singer National Film Award (Bangladesh) winners
10th Jatiya Sangsad members
21st-century Bangladeshi women singers
21st-century Bangladeshi singers
11th Jatiya Sangsad members
21st-century Bangladeshi women politicians
Women members of the Jatiya Sangsad